Databases for oncogenomic research are biological databases dedicated to cancer data and oncogenomic research. They can be a primary source of cancer data, offer a certain level of analysis (processed data) or even offer online data mining.

List

The table below gives an overview of databases for that serve specifically for oncogenomic research. Note that this is not a comprehensive list and does not contain databases that have a generic focus. You may find databases containing cancer data among the List of biological databases or Microarray databases.

See also
 Cancer Research
 List of biological databases
 Microarray databases
 Oncogenomics
 Oncology

Notes

References

External links
 National Cancer Institute's List of Datasets and Databases

Applied genetics
Biological databases
Medical genetics
Cancer genome databases